Freeways, highways, and arterial roads in Perth, Western Australia form the basis of the road network inside the Perth Metropolitan Region. Main Roads Western Australia controls and maintains all freeways and highways, as well as some arterial roads, collectively known as state roads. The remaining roads are the responsibility of local governments; major roads provide links to various destinations within Perth Metropolitan Region.

Some of these roads, or portions of them, are designated and signposted as part of a road route. National Highways and National Routes are road routes of national significance, whilst State Routes in Perth are allocated to the main routes connecting its urban centres. Additionally, roads through areas of scenic or historic significance are designated as part of a Tourist Drive. Each route has a unique marker: National Highways have gold numbers on a green shield, National Routes have black numbers on a white shield, State Routes have white numbers on a blue shield, Tourist Drives have white numbers on a brown shield.

See also

 List of major roads in rural Western Australia
 List of highways in Western Australia
 List of road routes in Western Australia

References

 

 
Major roads
Perth